Michael Dansby (born June 30, 1983) is a former American football offensive linemen. He attended Jackson State. In 2007, Michael made his pro debut for the Arkansas Twisters of the af2 under head coach John Gregory. In 2008 Dansby signed with the Iowa Barnstormers. He has been named the Barnstormers "Linemen of the Year" for three years in a row (2008-2010).

References

Living people
American football offensive tackles
Jackson State Tigers football players
Arkansas Twisters players
1983 births
Iowa Barnstormers players
Players of American football from Birmingham, Alabama